The Army of the Potomac was the principal Union Army in the Eastern Theater of the American Civil War. It was created in July 1861 shortly after the First Battle of Bull Run and was disbanded in June 1865 following the surrender of the Confederate Army of Northern Virginia in April.

History
The Army of the Potomac was created in 1861 but was then only the size of a corps (relative to the size of Union armies later in the war). Its nucleus was called the Army of Northeastern Virginia, under Brig. Gen. Irvin McDowell, and it was the army that fought (and lost) the war's first major battle, the First Battle of Bull Run. The arrival in Washington, D.C., of Maj. Gen. George B. McClellan dramatically changed the makeup of that army. McClellan's original assignment was to command the Division of the Potomac, which included the Department of Northeast Virginia under McDowell and the Department of Washington under Brig. Gen. Joseph K. Mansfield. 

On July 26, 1861, the Department of the Shenandoah, commanded by Maj. Gen. Nathaniel P. Banks, was merged with McClellan's departments and on that day, McClellan formed the Army of the Potomac, which was composed of all military forces in the former Departments of Northeastern Virginia, Washington, Pennsylvania, and the Shenandoah.  The men under Banks's command became an infantry division in the Army of the Potomac. The army started with four corps, but these were divided during the Peninsula Campaign to produce two more. After the Second Battle of Bull Run, the Army of the Potomac absorbed the units that had served under Maj. Gen. John Pope.

The belief that John Pope commanded the Army of the Potomac in the summer of 1862 after McClellan's unsuccessful Peninsula Campaign is mistaken. On the contrary, Pope's Army of Virginia was built around different units, although three corps of the Army of the Potomac were sent to northern Virginia and were under Pope's operational control during the Northern Virginia Campaign. During the time that the Army of Virginia existed, the Army of the Potomac was headquartered on the Virginia Peninsula, and then outside Washington, D.C., with McClellan still in command, although most of his troops had been temporarily re-assigned. After Pope's defeat at Second Bull Run, McClellan was given back his original units, plus most of the units of the Army of Virginia, which were integrated into the Army of the Potomac - although not always successfully.

The Army of the Potomac underwent many structural changes during its existence. The army was divided by Ambrose Burnside into three grand divisions of two corps each with a Reserve composed of two more. Hooker abolished the grand divisions. Thereafter the individual corps, seven of which remained in Virginia, reported directly to army headquarters. Hooker also created a Cavalry Corps by combining units that previously had served as smaller formations. In late 1863, two corps were sent West, and— in 1864— the remaining five corps were recombined into three. Burnside's IX Corps, which accompanied the army at the start of Ulysses S. Grant's Overland Campaign, rejoined the army later. For more detail, see the section Corps below.

The Army of the Potomac fought in most of the Eastern Theater campaigns, primarily in (Eastern) Virginia, Maryland, and Pennsylvania. After the end of the war, it was disbanded on June 28, 1865, shortly following its participation in the Grand Review of the Armies.

The Army of the Potomac was also the name given to General P. G. T. Beauregard's Confederate army during the early stages of the war (namely, First Bull Run; thus, the losing Union Army ended up adopting the name of the winning Confederate army). However, the name was eventually changed to the Army of Northern Virginia, which became famous under General Robert E. Lee.

In 1869 the Society of the Army of the Potomac was formed as a veterans association.  It had its last reunion in 1929.

Noted units

Because of its proximity to the large cities of the North, such as Washington, D.C., Philadelphia, and New York City, the Army of the Potomac received more contemporary media coverage than the other Union field armies. Such coverage produced fame for a number of this army's units. Individual brigades, such as the Irish Brigade, the Philadelphia Brigade, the First New Jersey Brigade, the Vermont Brigade, and the Iron Brigade, all became well known to the general public, both during the Civil War and afterward.

Corps

The army originally consisted of fifteen divisions, the Artillery Reserve and the Cavalry Command. Commanded by Edwin V. Sumner, William B. Franklin, Louis Blenker, Nathaniel P. Banks, Frederick W. Lander (Replaced by James Shields after Lander's death on March 2, 1862, Silas Casey, Irvin McDowell, Fitz John Porter, Samuel P. Heintzelman, Don Carlos Buell (Replaced by Erasmus D. Keyes in November, 1861),  William F. Smith, Joseph Hooker, John A. Dix, Charles P. Stone (Replaced by John Sedgwick in February, 1862), George A. McCall, George Stoneman (Replaced by Philip St. George Cooke in January, 1862) and Henry J. Hunt. Because this arrangement would be too hard to control in battle, President Lincoln issued an order on March 13, 1862, dividing the army into five corps headed by MG Irvin McDowell (I Corps; Franklin's Division: BG William B. Franklin, McCall's "Pennsylvania Reserves" Division: BG George A. McCall and McDowell's old Division under BG Rufus King.), BG Edwin V. Sumner (II Corps; Sumner's old Division under BG Israel B. Richardson, Sedgwick's Division: BG John Sedgwick and Blenker's Division: Louis Blenker.), BG Samuel P. Heintzelman (III Corps; Porter's Division: BG Fitz John Porter, Hooker's Division: BG Joseph Hooker and Heintzelman's old Division under BG Charles S. Hamilton), BG Erasmus D. Keyes (IV Corps; Keyes' old Division under BG Darius N. Couch, Smith's Division: BG William F. Smith and Casey's Division: BG Silas Casey), MG Nathaniel P. Banks (V Corps would later become the XII Corps; Banks' old Division under BG Alpheus S. Williams, Shield's Division: BG James Shields and a Cavalry Division under BG John P. Hatch). The five highest-ranking officers division commanders in the army, McClellan was not happy with this, as he had intended to wait until the army had been tested in battle before judging which generals were suitable for corps command.

After the Battle of Williamsburg on May 5, McClellan requested and obtained permission to create two additions corps; these became the V Corps, headed by BG Fitz-John Porter, and the VI Corps, headed by BG William B. Franklin, both personal favorites of his. After the Battle of Kernstown in the Valley on March 23, the administration became paranoid about "Stonewall" Jackson's activities there and the potential danger they posed to Washington D.C., and to McClellan's displeasure, detached Blenker's division from the II Corps and sent it to West Virginia to serve under John C. Fremont's command. McDowell's corps was detached as well and stationed in the Rappahannock area.

In June 1862, George McCall's division from McDowell's corps (the Pennsylvania Reserves Division) was sent down to the Peninsula and temporarily attached to the V Corps. In the Seven Days Battles, the V Corps was heavily engaged. The Pennsylvania Reserves, in particular, suffered heavy losses including its division commander, who was captured by the Confederates, and two of its three brigadiers (John F. Reynolds, also captured, and George Meade, who was wounded). The III Corps fought at Glendale, however, the rest of the army was not heavily engaged in the week-long fight aside from Slocum's division of the VI Corps, which was sent to reinforce the V Corps at Gaines Mill.

The Army of the Potomac remained on the Virginia Peninsula until August, when it was recalled back to Washington D.C. Keyes and one of the two IV Corps divisions were left behind permanently as part of the newly created Department of the James, while the other division, commanded by Brig. Gen Darius Couch was attached to the VI Corps.

During the Second Battle of Bull Run, the III and V Corps were temporarily attached to Pope's army; the former suffered major losses and was sent back to Washington to rest and refit afterward, so it did not participate in the Maryland Campaign. The V Corps attracted controversy during the battle when Fitz-John Porter failed to execute Pope's orders properly and attack Stonewall Jackson's flank despite his protests that James Longstreet's troops were blocking the way. Pope blamed the loss at Second Bull Run on Porter, who was court-martialed and spent much of his life attempting to get himself exonerated. Sigel's command, now redesignated the XI Corps, also spent the Maryland Campaign in Washington resting and refitting.

In the Maryland Campaign, the Army of the Potomac had six corps. These were the I Corps, commanded by Joe Hooker after Irvin McDowell was removed from command, the II Corps, commanded by Edwin Sumner, the V Corps, headed by Fitz-John Porter, the VI Corps, headed by William Franklin, the IX Corps, headed by Ambrose Burnside and formerly the Department of North Carolina, and the XII Corps, headed by Nathaniel Banks until September 12, and given to Joseph K. Mansfield just two days prior to Antietam, where he was killed in action.

At Antietam, the I and XII Corps were the first Union outfits to fight and both corps suffered enormous casualties (plus the loss of their commanders) so that they were down to near-division strength and their brigades at regimental strength after the battle was over. The II and IX Corps were also heavily engaged but the V and VI Corps largely stayed out of the battle.

When Burnside took over command of the army from McClellan in the fall, he formed the army into four Grand Divisions. The Right Grand Division was commanded by Edwin Sumner and comprised the II and XI Corps, the Center Grand Division, commanded by Joe Hooker, comprised the V and III Corps, and the Left Grand Division, commanded by William Franklin, comprised the VI and I Corps. In addition, the Reserve Grand Division, commanded by Franz Sigel, comprised the XI and XII Corps.

At Fredericksburg, the I Corps was commanded by John F. Reynolds, the II Corps by Darius Couch, the III Corps by George Stoneman, the V Corps by Daniel Butterfield, the VI Corps by William F. Smith, and the IX Corps by Orlando Willcox. The XI Corps was commanded by Franz Sigel and the XII Corps by Henry Slocum, however, neither corps was present at Fredericksburg, the former not arriving until after the battle was over, and the latter was stationed at Harper's Ferry.

Following Fredericksburg, Burnside was removed from command of the army and replaced by Joe Hooker. Hooker immediately abolished the Grand Divisions and also for the first time organized the cavalry into a proper corps led by George Stoneman instead of having them ineffectually scattered among infantry divisions. Burnside and his old IX Corps departed out to a command in the Western Theater. The I, II, and XII Corps retained the same commanders they had had during the Fredericksburg campaign, but the other corps got new commanders once again. Daniel Butterfield was chosen by Hooker as his new chief of staff and command of the V Corps went to George Meade. Daniel Sickles received command of the III Corps and Oliver Howard the XI Corps after Franz Sigel had resigned, refusing to serve under Hooker, his junior in rank. William Franklin also left the army for the same reason. Edwin Sumner, who was in his 60s and exhausted from campaigning, departed as well and died a few months later. William F. Smith resigned from command of the VI Corps, which was taken over by John Sedgwick. The I and V Corps were not significantly engaged during the Chancellorsville campaign.

During the Gettysburg Campaign, the army's existing organization was largely retained, but a number of brigades composed of short-term nine-month regiments departed as their enlistment terms expired. Darius Couch resigned from command of the II Corps after Chancellorsville, the corps going to Winfield Hancock. The Pennsylvania Reserves Division, having spent several months in Washington D.C. resting and refitting from the 1862 campaigns, returned to the army, but was added to the V Corps rather than rejoining the I Corps. George Stoneman had been removed from command of the cavalry corps by Hooker after a poor performance during the Chancellorsville campaign and replaced by Alfred Pleasanton.

George Meade was suddenly appointed the commander of the army on June 28, a mere three days before the battle of Gettysburg. At the battle, the I, II, and III Corps suffered such severe losses that they were almost nonfunctional as fighting units at the end. One corps commander (Reynolds) was killed, another (Sickles) lost a leg and was permanently out of the war, and a third (Hancock) was badly wounded and never completely recovered from his injuries. The VI Corps had not been significantly engaged and was mostly used to plug up holes in the line during the battle.

For the remainder of the war, corps were added and subtracted from the army. IV Corps was broken up after the Peninsula Campaign, with its headquarters and 2nd Division left behind in Yorktown, while its 1st Division moved north, attached to the VI Corps, in the Maryland Campaign. Those parts of the IV Corps that remained on the Peninsula were reassigned to the Department of Virginia and disbanded on October 1, 1863. Those added to the Army of the Potomac were IX Corps, XI Corps (Sigel's I Corps in the former Army of Virginia), XII Corps (Banks's II Corps from the Army of Virginia), added in 1862; and the Cavalry Corps, created in 1863. Eight of these corps (seven infantry, one cavalry) served in the army during 1863, but due to attrition and transfers, the army was reorganized in March 1864 with only four corps: II, V, VI, and Cavalry. Of the original eight, I and III Corps were disbanded due to heavy casualties and their units combined into other corps. The XI and XII Corps were ordered to the West in late 1863 to support the Chattanooga Campaign, and while there were combined into the XX Corps, never returning to the East.

The IX Corps returned to the army in 1864, after being assigned to the West in 1863 and then served alongside, but not as part of, the Army of the Potomac from March to May 24, 1864. On that latter date, IX Corps was formally added to the Army of the Potomac. Two divisions of the Cavalry Corps have transferred in August 1864 to Maj. Gen. Philip Sheridan's Army of the Shenandoah, and the 2nd Division alone remained under Meade's command. On March 26, 1865, that division was also assigned to Sheridan for the closing campaigns of the war.

Commanders
Brigadier General Irvin McDowell: Commander of the Army and Department of Northeastern Virginia (May 27 – July 25, 1861)
Major General George B. McClellan: Commander of the Military Division of the Potomac, and later, the Army and Department of the Potomac (July 26, 1861 – November 9, 1862)
Major General Ambrose E. Burnside: Commander of the Army of the Potomac (November 9, 1862 – January 26, 1863)
Major General Joseph Hooker: Commander of the Army and Department of the Potomac (January 26 – June 28, 1863)
Major General George G. Meade: Commander of the Army of the Potomac† (June 28, 1863 – June 28, 1865)††

Notes
†Lt. Gen. Ulysses S. Grant, general-in-chief of all Union armies, located his headquarters with the Army of the Potomac and provided operational direction to Meade from May 1864 to April 1865, but Meade retained command of the Army of the Potomac.

††Major General John G. Parke took brief temporary command during Meade's absences on four occasions during this period)

Major battles and campaigns
First Bull Run Campaign or First Manassas: McDowell (as "Army of Northeastern Virginia")
Peninsula Campaign, including the Seven Days Battles: McClellan
Northern Virginia Campaign, including the Second Battle of Bull Run (I, XI, XII Corps participated under the control of the Army of Virginia)
Maryland Campaign, including the Battle of Antietam: McClellan
Fredericksburg Campaign: Burnside
Chancellorsville Campaign: Hooker
Gettysburg Campaign: Hooker/Meade (Meade appointed June 28, 1863)
Bristoe Campaign: Meade
Mine Run Campaign: Meade
Overland Campaign: Grant & Meade
Richmond–Petersburg Campaign, including the Battle of the Crater: Grant & Meade
Appomattox Campaign, including Lee's surrender at Appomattox Court House: Grant & Meade

Casualties breakdown

Below is the grand recapitulation of the losses sustained by the Army of the Potomac and the Army of the James, from May 5, 1864 to April 9, 1865, compiled in the Adjutant-General's Office, Washington:

References
Notes

Bibliography
 Beatie, Russel H. Army of the Potomac: Birth of Command, November 1860 – September 1861. New York: Da Capo Press, 2002. .
 Beatie, Russel H. Army of the Potomac: McClellan Takes Command, September 1861 – February 1862. New York: Da Capo Press, 2004. .
 Beatie, Russel H. Army of the Potomac: McClellan's First Campaign, March – May 1862. New York: Savas Beatie, 2007. .
 Eicher, John H. and Eicher, David J., Civil War High Commands, Stanford University Press, 2001, .
 Welcher, Frank J. The Union Army, 1861–1865 Organization and Operations. Vol. 1, The Eastern Theater. Bloomington: Indiana University Press, 1989. .

Further reading
 Chamberlain, Joshua L. The Passing of the Armies: An Account of the Final Campaign of the Army of the Potomac. New York: Bantam Books, 1993. . First published in 1915 by G.P. Putnam's Sons.
 Sears, Stephen W. Lincoln's Lieutenants: The High Command of the Army of the Potomac (Boston: Houghton Mifflin Harcourt, 2017), xii, 884 pp.
 Taaffe, Stephen R. Commanding the Army of the Potomac. Lawrence: University of Kansas Press, 2006. .

External links

 Army Organization during the Civil War
 
 

Potomac, Army of the
Military units and formations established in 1861
Military units and formations disestablished in 1865
Virginia in the American Civil War
1861 establishments in Virginia
1865 disestablishments in the United States